Jordi Baininwa Liongola (born 17 May 2000) is a professional footballer who plays as a midfielder for Belgian National Division 1 club RAAL La Louvière. Born in Belgium, he plays for the Burundi national team.

Club career
Liongola is a former youth academy player of Standard Liège and Royal Antwerp. In July 2021, he signed a one-year deal with Belgian second division club Lierse Kempenzonen. He made his professional debut on 22 August 2021 in a 2–0 league win against R.E. Virton.

In July 2022, Liongola joined RAAL La Louvière.

International career
Born in Belgium, Liongola is of Burundian descent, thus making him eligible to represent both countries. He is a former Belgium national team player.

In November 2019, he received maiden call-up to Burundi national team for 2021 Africa Cup of Nations qualification matches against Morocco and Central African Republic. He debuted with Burundi in a 2–1 friendly win over Liberia on 29 March 2022.

Career statistics

Club

International

References

External links
 

2000 births
Living people
Sportspeople from Hasselt
Footballers from Limburg (Belgium)
Burundian footballers
Burundi international footballers
Belgian footballers
Belgium youth international footballers
Belgian people of Burundian descent
Association football midfielders
Challenger Pro League players
Lierse Kempenzonen players